Capital punishment in Botswana is a legal penalty, and is usually applied for murder under aggravated circumstances. Executions are carried out by hanging. There is on average one execution per year, and the execution usually takes place some years after the trial. One execution was carried out in 2016, two in 2018, one in 2019, and one in 2020.

A controversial case was that of Mariette Bosch, a South African immigrant who was sentenced to death for murdering her lover's wife. She was sentenced in 1999 and executed two years later. She was the fourth woman to be executed since independence in 1966 and one of the few white women ever executed in Africa. She was hanged in secret, without her relatives being notified.

The human rights organisation Ditshwanelo has campaigned against the death penalty. By 2018 over 40 African countries had stopped capital punishment and Botswana was now the only country practising it in the Southern African Development Community. In 2020, Mmika Michael Mpe was hanged for the 2014 murder of Reinette Vorster.

See also

 Botswana Prison Service

References

External links
 Winslow, Dr. Robert. "Botswana." (Archive) A Comparative Criminology Tour of the World. San Diego State University.
 "DEATH PENALTY: Five Years after Bosch, Nothing Changed in Botswana." (Archive) University of Westminster. 1 November 2011.
 Full article: Gabotlale, Bester. "DEATH PENALTY: Five Years after Bosch, Nothing Changed in Botswana." Inter Press Service.
 Novak, Andrew (student author). "Guilty of Murder with Extenuating Circumstances: Transparency and the Mandatory Death Penalty in Botswana." (Archive) Boston University International Law Journal. Spring (northern hemisphere) 2009. Volume 27, Issue 1, p. 173. ISSN 0737-8947. Available on EBSCOHost, HeinOnline, and LexisNexis Academic.
Gabaakanye executed 25 May 2016

Capital punishment in Botswana
Law of Botswana
Human rights abuses in Botswana